Eric Unverzagt (born December 18, 1972) is a former linebacker who played in the National Football League.

Biography
Unverzagt was born Eric James Unverzagt on December 18, 1972 in Central Islip, New York.

Career
Unverzagt was drafted in the fourth round of the 1996 NFL Draft by the Seattle Seahawks and played with the team for two seasons. He played at the collegiate level at the University of Wisconsin-Madison.

References

1972 births
Living people
People from Central Islip, New York
Players of American football from New York (state)
Seattle Seahawks players
American football linebackers
University of Wisconsin–Madison alumni
Wisconsin Badgers football players
Scottish Claymores players